The 500 meters distance for men in the 2013–14 ISU Speed Skating World Cup was contested over 12 races on six occasions, out of a total of six World Cup occasions for the season, with the first occasion taking place in Calgary, Alberta, Canada, on 8–10 November 2013, and the final occasion taking place in Heerenveen, Netherlands, on 14–16 March 2014.

Dutchman Ronald Mulder won the cup, while his twin brother Michel Mulder came second. Fellow Dutchman, defending champion Jan Smeekens, completed an all-Dutch podium.

Top three

Race medallists

Standings 
Standings as of 16 March 2014 (end of the season).

References 

 
Men 0500